Muddy Waters Sings "Big Bill" is the first studio album, but second overall album by blues musician Muddy Waters, featuring songs by Big Bill Broonzy, released by the Chess label in 1960.

Reception

AllMusic reviewer Cub Koda stated "Waters's tribute album to the man who gave him his start on the Chicago circuit, this stuff doesn't sound much like Broonzy so much as a virtual recasting of his songs into Muddy's electric Chicago style. Evidently the first time Waters and his band were recorded in stereo ... with some really great harp from James Cotton as an added bonus."

Track listing 
All compositions by Big Bill Broonzy except where noted
 "Tell Me Baby" – 2:15
 "Southbound Train" – 2:51
 "When I Get to Thinking" (Harriett Melka) – 3:05
 "Just a Dream (On My Mind)" – 2:30
 "Double Trouble" (Melka) – 2:44
 "I Feel So Good" – 2:53
 "I Done Got Wise" (McKinley Morganfield) – 2:56
 "Mopper's Blues" – 2:51
 "Lonesome Road Blues" – 3:01
 "Hey, Hey" – 2:41

Personnel 
Muddy Waters – vocals, guitar
James Cotton – harmonica
Otis Spann – piano
Pat Hare – guitar
Andrew Stephenson – bass
Francis Clay – drums

References 

1960 albums
Muddy Waters albums
Chess Records albums